Ghulam Ali is a Muslim male given name. In Persian-language use it is transliterated as Gholam Ali. It may refer to:

People
Shah Ghulam Ali Dehlavi (1743–1824), Sufi Shaykh in Delhi
Gholam Ali-khan (1783–1784), khan of the Erivan khanate
Ahmed Ghulamali Chagla (1902–1953), Pakistani musical composer
Bade Ghulam Ali Khan (1902–1968), Indian classical singer who belonged to the Patiala Gharana
Gholam Ali Oveisi (1918–1984) Iranian general
Ghulam Ali (singer) (born 1940), Pakistani ghazal singer of the Patiala gharana
Gholam-Ali Haddad-Adel (born 1945), Iranian philosopher and politician
Ghulam Ali (cricketer) (born 1966), Pakistani cricketer
Ghulam Ali Allana, friend and biographer of Muhammad Ali Jinnah, founder of Pakistan
Mir Ghulam Ali, official of the Tippu Sultanate

Places
Gholamali, Hamadan, village in Razan County, Hamadan Province, Iran
Gholamali, Khuzestan, village in Andika County, Khuzestan Province, Iran
Gholamali, Kurdistan, village in Saqqez County, Kurdistan Province, Iran
Gholam Ali, Sistan and Baluchestan, village in Hirmand County, Sistan and Baluchestan Province, Iran 
Porzinastan, also known as Gholamali, Shushtar County, Khuzestan Province, Iran
Kas Ali Mirzayi, also known as Gholam Ali, Kuhdasht County, Lorestan Province, Iran

See also
Ghulam (disambiguation)
Ali (disambiguation)